The R535 is a Regional Route in South Africa.

Route
Its western origin is the R533 between Graskop and Bushbuckridge in Mpumalanga. It heads east ending at the R40 between Bushbuckridge and Hazyview.

References

Regional Routes in Mpumalanga